Henry Brooke may refer to:

Henry Cobham (diplomat) (1537–1592), real name Henry Brooke, MP for Kent
Henry Brooke, 11th Baron Cobham (1564–1618), English peer, Lord Warden of the Cinque Ports and Lord Lieutenant of Kent, plotter against James I
Sir Henry Brooke, 1st Baronet (died 1664), English soldier and Cheshire
Henry Brooke (Irish politician) (1671–1761), Irish MP for Dundalk and Fermanagh
Henry Brooke (divine) (1694–1757), English schoolmaster and divine
Henry Brooke (writer) (1703–1783), Irish novelist and dramatist
Henry Brooke (artist) (1738–1806), Irish painter
Henry Vaughan Brooke (1743–1807), Irish MP for Donegal Borough and County, British MP for Donegal
Henry James Brooke (1771–1857), English crystallographer
William Henry Brooke (1772–1860), Irish painter and illustrator
Henry Francis Brooke (1838–1880), Irish Brigadier-General in the British Army
Henry Brooke, Baron Brooke of Cumnor (1903–1984), British life peer and Conservative Party politician
Henry Brooke (judge) (1936–2018), British former Lord Justice of Appeal

See also
Henry Brooks (disambiguation)
Harry Brooks (disambiguation)